The Beetle is the name used by multiple fictional characters appearing in American comic books published by Marvel Comics. It is also the name of three versions of high tech armor used by seven separate characters.

The numerous incarnations of the Beetle have also appeared in Marvel-licensed media, such as television series and video games.

Publication history
The Beetle debuted in the "Human Torch" segment of Strange Tales #123 (August 1964) with the original incarnation Abner Jenkins using the first armor. This version was beaten by the Thing and Human Torch. The Human Torch had another tussle with the Beetle in The Amazing Spider-Man #21 (Jan 1965), aided by Spider-Man.

This version would be used until the character switched to the second armor in Peter Parker, the Spectacular Spider-Man #59 (October 1981) (which is most associated with the name) and would be in use until Thunderbolts #1 (April 1997) when Jenkins's alter ego was changed to MACH-1. A new version debuted in Thunderbolts #35 (February 2000). This version resembled a walking tank and would be used by Jenkins and the second incarnation Leila Davis. This version was crushed by Graviton, killing Davis who was still inside at the time. After Davis's death, the Beetle armor would go unused until Thunderbolts #103 (August 2006) when all three versions were stolen and used by three college students. The individual names of these characters were not revealed in this initial appearance.

Fictional character biography

Abner Jenkins

An ex-master mechanic, Abner Jenkins left his career to pursue life as an adventurer seeking wealth and fame under the Beetle name. A defeat at the Fantastic Four's hands sent Beetle into the direction of a life of crime where he was even a member of the Masters of Evil. Years later, Jenkins joined the Thunderbolts, a choice that eventually took him on a more heroic pathway in life.

Leila Davis

The widow of minor supervillain Ringer, Leila Davis began her criminal career as a driver for the super villain Sinister Syndicate team. After Ringer's death, Leila would go on to have her own costumed career, first as Hardshell and finally as the Beetle. She was killed when Graviton crushed the Beetle armor with her still inside.

Leila is introduced as the widow of the Ringer (Anthony Davis). After Anthony is manipulated by Abner Jenkins into a life of crime that included multiple conflicts with Spider-Man, he was shot by the anti-hero Scourge. Leila vows revenge on all three. She joins the Sinister Syndicate team led by Jenkins to get close to him. She also serves as the group's getaway driver.

Once Boomerang is captured by Spider-Man on the group's first mission, she began dating Speed Demon. Eventually, the Shocker engineers a breakout for Boomerang and the team fractures, with Boomerang, Rhino and Leila (using her husband's old weapons) battling the Beetle, Speed Demon and Hydro-Man in the middle of New York City. After attempting to kill Beetle, Leila is disarmed by Spider-Man and arrested along with Jenkins and Boomerang.

Sometime later, she is paroled from prison and immediately returns to her old ways. Donning a new red and black suit of weaponized armor and referring to herself as "Hardshell", she allies with Boomerang, Rhino and the Vulture. The group becomes involved in a massive fight that also involves Stegron, Doctor Octopus, Swarm, the Answer, Jenkins and Spider-Man, with each party trying to gain control of an experimental gun. Spider-Man eventually stood victorious and most of the costumed criminals are taken into custody. Leila is teleported away by her husband Anthony, who had survived being shot by Scourge and had been turned into the cyborg Strikeback by the criminal organization A.I.M.

She reappears years later taking on the Thunderbolts team (which a reformed Jenkins helped found), ironically now referring to herself as the "Beetle". She is wearing a tank-like exoskeleton painted in the same paint scheme as both of Jenkins' previous Beetle costumes—a new iteration of the Beetle armor that Jenkins himself had designed while working for the Commission on Superhuman Activities.

As the second Beetle, Leila eventually joins the group known as the Redeemers, which includes former members of the Thunderbolts. When her true identity is revealed to the rest of her teammates, she tells them that her husband Anthony died some time earlier due to his body breaking down due to his cyborg enhancements.

The group soon encounters the powerful super villain Graviton, and quickly into the fight he nonchalantly uses his gravity powers to crush the Beetle armor - with Leila inside - into a small cube, killing her instantly.

Powers and abilities
As Hardshell, Leila wore a powered suit which granted her superhuman strength and durability, and a variety of weapons.

As the second Beetle, her suit possessed artificial wings which allowed her to fly while also giving her superhuman strength and durability and different weapons.

The three Beetles
Three college students stole the previous incarnations of the Beetle armor during Marvel's Civil War event. The individual piloting the first version was called Joaquim and the person in the second version was revealed to be female. No other information was revealed about them in their subsequent appearances in Thunderbolts.

In those issues which made up a storyline named the "Guardian Protocols", they defend the city of Dallas against a plot by the Grandmaster as members of an enlarged Thunderbolts team recruited by Baron Zemo and consisting of numerous supervillains. When the Overmind lets the full power of the Wellspring (the source of power the Grandmaster is using) loose when he attempts to revive Baron Zemo, the defenders of Sydney and Dallas are overrun, with the three Beetles presumably among them.

In 2007, the three Beetles were identified among the 142 registered superheroes who appear on the cover of the comic book Avengers: The Initiative #1.

The Official Handbook of the Marvel Universe A-Z Update #5 revealed that the three college students that wear the three Beetle armors are named Joaquim Robichaux, Elizabeth Vaughn and Gary Quinn.

Janice Lincoln

A new female Beetle attacks Captain America and Black Widow. The two managed to defeat her and remand her to The Raft. As part of the Marvel NOW! event, Beetle returns as a member of the latest incarnation of the Sinister Six. In this appearance, her first name is revealed to be Janice, and is later revealed to be the daughter of Tombstone.

Beetle features as one of the main characters in The Superior Foes of Spider-Man. Janice's origin is later recounted, where it is shown that as a child, she idolized her father and his criminal activities, but was forbidden to take part in them. After building a successful career as a defense attorney, she was appointed to defend Baron Zemo, at which point she volunteered to work for him as the new Beetle. Janice's armor is also revealed to have been built by the Fixer.

Hobgoblin's Beetle
Roderick Kingsley had sold one of Abner Jenkins's old Beetle armors and gear to an unnamed criminal. He was seen at the Bar With No Name attending the wake of Electro's servant Francine Frye. Beetle was later seen at the Bar With No Name among the patrons who want the Black Cat to be the Queen of the Criminal Underworld.

The Hobgoblin later regained the services of Beetle.

Other versions

Marvel UK
The Beetle name was used by an armored S.T.R.I.K.E. superhuman restraint squad in the Jaspers' Warp story arc published by the Marvel UK imprint.

Ultimate Marvel
The Ultimate Marvel version of Beetle is a mysterious unnamed mercenary from Latveria with a completely revamped armor. Spider-Man first finds Beetle robbing a sample of the Venom symbiote from Roxxon. This doesn't go well for Venom and the resulting battle left the Venom sample useless for Beetle to bring to Latveria.

Beetle later breaks into Bolivar Trask's lab where Eddie Brock is held, leading to Venom chasing after Beetle. Just as Beetle is cornered, Venom is stopped by Spider-Man. When the Venom symbiote leaves Brock and attaches to Spider-Man, Beetle escapes in the confusion.

Disguised as a civilian which Brock least expected, Beetle later captures Venom in Central Park and flies off with him to deliver Venom to Latveria.

Beetle's suit is later seen being repaired by the Tinkerer when a group of villains arrives for weapons against Spider-Man.

In other media

Television
 The Abner Jenkins incarnation of the Beetle appeared in the Spider-Man and His Amazing Friends episode "Origin of the Spider-Friends", voiced by Christopher Collins. 
 The Abner Jenkins incarnation of the Beetle makes a brief appearance in the Iron Man episode "Armor Wars" Pt. 1, voiced by John Reilly with a Liverpudlian accent evocative of the similarly named band.
 The Ultimate Marvel incarnation of the Beetle appears in Ultimate Spider-Man, voiced by Steve Blum. This version is a highly capable criminal mercenary who is mostly silent and has an unusually large amount of fold-out rocket launchers hidden in his armor. Following his introduction in the episode "Beetle Mania", in which he mounts a failed attempt on J. Jonah Jameson's life, the Beetle has several confrontations with Spider-Man throughout the series alongside the Sinister Six, Taskmaster, the Grandmaster, and HYDRA, only to be defeated by the web-slinger and his allies each time.
 Additionally, the Abner Jenkins and Leila Davis incarnations of the Beetle make non-speaking cameo appearances in "Beetle Mania" within the S.H.I.E.L.D. trainees' imagination.
 The Abner Jenkins incarnation of the Beetle appears in Avengers Assemble, voiced by Mark C. Hanson.
 The Abner Jenkins incarnation of the Beetle appears in Spider-Man, voiced by Fred Tatasciore.

Film
Janice Lincoln appears in the Marvel Cinematic Universe film Spider-Man: Far From Home, portrayed by Claire Rushbrook.

Video games

 The Abner Jenkins incarnation of the Beetle appears in Spider-Man.
 The Abner Jenkins incarnation of the Beetle appears as the first boss of Spider-Man: Lethal Foes.
 The Abner Jenkins incarnation of the Beetle appears in Spider-Man 2: Enter Electro, voiced by Daran Norris.
 The Ultimate Marvel incarnation of the Beetle appears in Ultimate Spider-Man, voiced by Tucker Smallwood. This version works for Latverian agents, collecting genetic information from superhumans to genetically-engineer super-soldiers.
 The Janice Lincoln incarnation of the Beetle appears as a boss in Marvel: Avengers Alliance.
 The Ultimate Marvel incarnation of the Beetle appears as a playable character in Lego Marvel Super Heroes, voiced again by Steve Blum.

Toys
 In 1997, the Abner Jenkins incarnation of the Beetle received an action figure in the Spider-Man: The Animated Series tie-in toyline despite not appearing in the show.
 In 2005, the Leila Davis incarnation of the Beetle received an action figure in the "Spider-Man Classics" line.
 In 2013, the Ultimate Marvel incarnation of Beetle received a figure in the Lego Ultimate Spider-Man "Daily Bugle Showdown" play set.
 In 2014, the Ultimate Marvel incarnation of the Beetle received a figure in The Amazing Spider-Man 2 line of the Marvel Legends series despite not appearing in the film.
 In 2016, the Janice Lincoln incarnation of the Beetle received an action figure in the Absorbing Man BAF (Build-A-Figure) Spider-Man Marvel Legends line.
 In 2017, the Abner Jenkins incarnation of the Beetle received an action figure in the Vulture Wing BAF Wave, coinciding with the release of the film Spider-Man: Homecoming.

References

External links
 Beetle (disambiguation) at the Marvel Universe
 Beetle at the Marvel Database Project

Articles about multiple fictional characters
Characters created by Carl Burgos
Characters created by Stan Lee
Comics characters introduced in 1963
Marvel Comics supervillains
Science fiction weapons
Spider-Man characters